The North Coast Section (NCS) is a part of the California Interscholastic Federation, governing the eastern portion of the San Francisco Bay Area, up along the northern coast of the state of California, from Fremont in the south to Crescent City in the north.  It also governs the private schools in the city of Oakland. Due to this split in regions, the section is split in two for some championships, including football.

Governance
The section is governed by a board of managers, whose voting members include representatives from member leagues, superintendents, school board associations and private schools. There are 155 full member schools, assigned to leagues or conferences according to NCS Alignment and Classification Bylaws developed by the schools. In addition, currently 20 schools have affiliated with the league to play as independents without the benefit of a league to guarantee opponents.

Conference and League Structure
Competition is broken down into a system of conferences and leagues which seek to organize schools first by size/competitiveness, and then by geographic proximity.

 North Coast Section
 Bay Area Conference - 27 schools
 Bay Counties League - 7 schools
 Bay Counties League - West - 6 schools 
 Bay Counties League - East - 7 schools
 Bay Counties League - Central - 7 schools
 Bay Shore Conference - 33 schools
 Mission Valley Athletic League - 8 schools
 Tri-County Athletic League - 13 schools
 West Alameda County Conference - 12 schools
 Coastal Mountain Conference - 24 schools
 North Central League I - 8 schools
 North Central League II - 7 schools
 North Central League III - 9 schools
 
 Humboldt-Del Norte League - 12 schools
 Big 5 – 5 schools
 Little 7 - 7 schools
 Redwood Empire Conference - 29 schools
 Marin County Athletic League - 9 schools
 North Bay League - 13 schools
 Vine Valley Athletic League - 7 schools
 Valley Conference - 30 schools
 Bay Valley Athletic League - 6 schools
 Diablo Athletic League - 13 schools
 East Bay Athletic League - 11 schools
 
 Non-League Affiliate Member Schools - 20 schools
 Archbishop Hanna High School (Sonoma)
 Averroes High School (Fremont)
 Cornerstone Christian School (Antioch)
 Cristo Rey De La Salle East Bay High School (Oakland)
 Developing Virtue Secondary School (Ukiah)
 El Sobrante Christian School (Richmond)
 Emery Secondary School (Emeryville)
 The Marin School (Mill Valley)
 Napa Christian (Napa)
 North Bay Christian Academy (Novato)
 North Hills Christian (Vallejo)
 Pacific Union College Prep (Angwin)
 Patten Academy of Christian Education (Oakland)
 Pleasant Hill Adventist Academy (Pleasant Hill)
 The Quarry Lane School (Dublin)
 Rio Lindo Adventist Academy (Healdsburg)
 Stellar Prep (Oakland)
 Summerfield Waldorf of Santa Rosa
 Summit K2
 Summit Tamalpais
 
 Single-sport waiver schools
 California School for the Deaf, Fremont (football)
 Oakland Military Institute (football, provisional WACC member)
 San Marin High School (Novato) (football, provisional NBL member)
 Valley Christian School (Dublin) (football)

Playoff Structure
The section employs 5 different classes, 4A, 3A, 2A, A, and B.  Depending on the sport, the "classes" may be represented by Divisions: I, II, III, IV, V, & VI, with DI being the largest schools, and DVI being the smallest. Some sports, including football, split the 3A and 2A sections into East Bay, for most of the Section's Bay Area schools, and Redwood Empire, for schools from Marin County north to the Oregon border.  The section has championships in badminton, baseball, basketball, cross country, football, golf, lacrosse, soccer, softball, swimming and diving, tennis, track and field, volleyball, water polo, and wrestling.

Notes

External links
 

 
High school sports in California
Organizations based in California
High school sports associations in the United States
Sports in the San Francisco Bay Area
California Interscholastic Federation sections